The 2016 West Coast Conference baseball tournament was held from May 26 through 28, 2016 at Banner Island Ballpark in Stockton, California.   won the four team, double-elimination tournament winner to earn the league's automatic bid to the 2016 NCAA Division I baseball tournament.

Seeding
The top four finishers from the regular season will be seeded one through four based on conference winning percentage.  The teams will then play a double elimination tournament. This year instead of playing a single championship game, a second championship rematch will be played should it be a match-up of two single loss teams. The change to the championship format moves the tournament championship from ESPNU to TheW.tv.

Tiebreakers:
Saint Mary's gets the #1 seed. Saint Mary's went 2–1 against both BYU and Gonzaga.
BYU gets the #2 seed. BYU went 2–1 against Gonzaga.
Gonzaga gets the #3 seed. Gonzaga went 1–2 against both BYU and Saint Mary's. 
LMU finishes tied for sixth in the conference standings, but they get spot #6 by right of a 2–1 record against San Diego.

Results

Box Scores

#4 Pepperdine vs. #1 Saint Mary's

#3 Gonzaga vs. #2 BYU

#4 Pepperdine vs. #2 BYU

#3 Gonzaga vs. #1 Saint Mary's

#4 Pepperdine vs. #3 Gonzaga

WCC Championship: #3 Gonzaga vs. #1 Saint Mary's

All-Tournament Team
The following players were named to the All-Tournament Team.

Most Outstanding Player
Zach Kirtley, a Sophomore infielder from Saint Mary's, was named Tournament Most Outstanding Player.

References

West Coast Conference Baseball Championship
West Coast Conference baseball tournament
Tournament
Baseball competitions in Stockton, California
College baseball tournaments in California